Miko Aarne Virtanen (born 29 January 1999) is a Finnish professional footballer who plays as a midfielder for Cove Rangers. He has previously played for Aberdeen, Arbroath and Hamilton Academical.

Club career

Youth career
Virtanen and his family moved to England when he was 13 years old after impressing Everton during an international youth tournament.

Aberdeen
On 2 November 2017, it was announced that Virtanen had joined Aberdeen until the end of the season after a successful trial with the club. He said upon signing that he hoped joining Aberdeen would help him secure his place in the Finland squad at the following year's Euro Under-19 finals.

Arbroath loans
On 29 August 2019, Virtanen moved to Arbroath on a season long loan. He made his debut on 28 September 2019, in a 2–1 away defeat against Dundee United in the Scottish Championship. He was again loaned to Arbroath in September 2020, until recalled by Aberdeen in January.

Hamilton Academical
In August 2021 he signed for Hamilton Academical. After making 24 appearances and scoring 1 goal over two seasons, Virtanen left Accies by mutual consent on 9 January 2023.

Cove Rangers
Following his release from Hamilton, Virtanen returned to the north-east of Scotland to sign for Scottish Championship side Cove Rangers on a deal until the end of the season.

Career statistics

Club

References

External links
Profile at the Arbroath F.C. website

1999 births
Living people
Finnish footballers
Finland youth international footballers
Association football midfielders
Everton F.C. players
Aberdeen F.C. players
Arbroath F.C. players
Hamilton Academical F.C. players
Scottish Professional Football League players
Finnish expatriate footballers
Expatriate footballers in England
Expatriate footballers in Scotland
Finnish expatriate sportspeople in England
Finnish expatriate sportspeople in Scotland
Finland under-21 international footballers
Cove Rangers F.C. players